Blacklick and Black Lick may refer to:

Communities:
 Blacklick, Ohio, an unincorporated village in Jefferson Township, Franklin County
Blacklick, Virginia
Black Lick, Pennsylvania, a census-designated place (CDP) in Indiana County
Black Lick Township, Indiana County, Pennsylvania
Blacklick Township, Cambria County, Pennsylvania

Streams:
Blacklick Creek (Ohio), a tributary of Big Walnut Creek
Blacklick Creek (Pennsylvania), a tributary of the Conemaugh River